Bengaluru Torpedoes is a men's volleyball team from Bengaluru, Karnataka playing in the Prime Volleyball League  in India. The team was founded in 2021 and owned by Limitless Human Performance.

Team

Current team

Administration and support staff

References 

Sports clubs in India
Volleyball in India
Men's volleyball teams
Sport in Karnataka
Sport in Bangalore